Indoreonectes evezardi is a species of ray-finned fish in the family Nemacheilidae. Earlier it was known as Nemacheilus evezardi described by Day (1878) captured from a river stream near Pune. It is endemic to India, found in the Western Ghats and the Satpuras. Most populations are found in normal streams, but two distinct cave-adapted forms exist in Kotumsar Cave.

Etymology
The fish is named in honor of Col. George C. Evezard (1826-1901), of the Bombay Staff Corps, who helped in procuring the type specimen.

Divergence of cave populations 
Due to lack of light and limited source of energy input (food) the cave populations of Indoreonectes evezardi are either found in albinic form with very regressed eyes or with very limited pigmentation and small eyes while compared to its epigean counterparts. Due to subterranean mode of life the complete physiological activities of the cave forms get limited and/or altered .

IUCN status 
Though in International Union for Conservation of Nature (IUCN) Red List of Threatened Species, this particular species is designated in Least Concern (LR/lc)category, but it could not be ruled out that special attention is required to protect the cave forms of Indoreonectes evezardi.

References 

 Biswas J. 1991 Metabolic efficiency and regulation of body weight: a comparison between life in hypogean and epigean ecosystems
 Biswas J. 1993 Constructive evolution: phylogenetic age related visual sensibility in the hypogean fish on Kotumsar Cave

 Biswas J. 2010 Kotumsar Cave biodiversity: a review of cavernicoles and their troglobiotic traits

Nemacheilidae
Fish of India
Fish of Asia
Cave fish
Taxa named by Francis Day
Fish described in 1872
Taxonomy articles created by Polbot